The , is a 48-book extended version of the Heike Monogatari (The Tale of the Heike).

References

External links
 Genpei Josuiki, Japanese text initiative, at University of Virginia Library

Japanese chronicles
Early Middle Japanese texts
Gunki monogatari